Anne-Marie Osawemwenze Ore-Ofe Imafidon  (born 24 June 1990) is a British-Nigerian computer scientist. Imafidon founded and became CEO of Stemettes in 2013, a social enterprise promoting women in STEM careers. She was a computing, mathematics and language child prodigy, having been one of the youngest people to pass two GCSEs in two different subjects while in primary school. In June 2022, she was announced as the British Science Association's new President.

Early life and education
Imafidon was born and raised in London. Her parents emigrated from Edo State, Nigeria to London. Imafidon is the youngest female ever to pass A-level computing at age 11 and passed two GCSEs in primary school.

After being offered a British scholarship to Johns Hopkins University in Baltimore, Maryland, she obtained her master's degree from Oxford University. She was one of the youngest people to receive a Computer Science Masters from Oxford University at just 20 years old. After obtaining her master's degree, Imafidon worked for many companies, including Goldman Sachs, Hewlett-Packard, and Deutsche Bank.

Imafidon was awarded an MBE in the 2017 New Year Honours for services to young women and STEM sectors. She holds honorary doctorates from Open University, Glasgow Caledonian University, Kent University, Bristol University, and Coventry University. She is also a visiting professor at the University of Sunderland and sits on the Council of Research England, and an Honorary Fellow at Keble College, Oxford.

Stemettes and entrepreneurship
Imafidon is the founder and CEO of Stemettes, a social initiative dedicated to inspiring the next generation of women in science, technology, engineering, and maths (STEM) careers. She started Stemettes in 2013 and has helped tens of thousands of girls realize their STEM potential. Imafidon has also launched Stemettes STEM resources app, which is used by thousands of high schoolers. Hundreds of Stemettes events have been held across Europe. At these events, teenagers benefit from mentorship from professionals at firms like Salesforce and Deutsche Bank.

Imafidon decided to start Stemettes after hearing a keynote speaker while attending the Grace Hopper Celebration of Women in Computing in 2012. She reflected on her own experience as a woman in STEM, being one of just three girls in a class of 70 while studying Maths and Computer Science at Oxford University. After attending a "Spotlight on STEM" workshop, Dr. Imafidon learned that the lack of women and non-binary people in STEM was a real problem. Eager to act, she decided to start Stemettes. Stemettes has exposed almost 50,000 young people across Europe to her vision of a more diverse and balanced science and tech community.

Imafidon also co-founded Outbox Incubator, which is the world's first tech incubator for teenage girls. The incubator provided seed funding, intensive mentorship, and support to talented young women aged 22 and under who have innovative business and technology ideas.

Work
Imafidon hosts the Women Tech Charge podcast for the Evening Standard, where she has conducted interviews with famous people in tech, such as Jack Dorsey, Rachel Riley, and Lewis Hamilton. She is also a trustee of the Institute for the Future of Work, who research and develop ways to improve work and working lives. Imafidon also works with organisations such as the BBC and 20th Century Fox to increase the representation of female technologists on screen.

In September 2021, Imafidon co-hosted a special episode of Channel 4's Countdown - broadcast for the channel's Black to Front Day campaign. She reprised the role later that year - standing in Rachel Riley while she was on maternity leave; she did the same also for an episode of 8 Out of 10 Cats Does Countdown which was broadcast in January 2023.

In December 2022, Imafidon guest-edited BBC Radio 4's Today programme.

In February of 2023, Dr. Anne-Marie Imafidon joined Kevin Stoller on the Better Learning Podcast. The Better Learning Podcast is all about improving education and bringing on valued guests that talk about ways we can improve education for our kids.

Recognition
She was recognized as one of the BBC's 100 women of 2017.

References

External links
 

1990 births
Living people
Mental calculators
English people of Nigerian descent
People from Barking, London
People educated at St Joseph's Convent School
Place of birth missing (living people)
Members of the Order of the British Empire
Female Fellows of the Royal Academy of Engineering
Alumni of the University of Oxford
BBC 100 Women
British women computer scientists
Science communicators